Il suo nome è Donna Rosa (Italian for Her name is Donna Rosa) is a 1969 Italian "musicarello" film directed by Ettore Maria Fizzarotti and starring Al Bano and Romina Power.

Plot    
Andrea, a young boatman from Capri, arrives in Naples on a commission; he clashes with Rosetta, a young student, and the clash causes him to break the arm of a jade statuette that he had to bring to an antiquarian, the widower Antonio Belmonte, who because of this pays him a lower price than hoped for.

It happens that Rosetta is the antiquarian's daughter, and having overheard the conversation in secret, she decides to bring Andrea's mother an envelope with some money to repay him for the damage she caused him.

The two young people thus begin dating and fall in love; Meanwhile, Rosetta's father woos Countess Rosa De Barberis, who however promised her deceased husband to marry only a nobleman, and for this reason Belmonte seeks the birth certificate of his great-great-grandfather, which would prove that his real surname is Di Belmonte and therefore is noble.

In the meantime, Rosetta mistakenly believes that Andrea is in love with a foreign tourist, and is therefore wooed by the son of Countess De Barberis, Giorgio, a lover of the game, who because of his "vice" puts his mother in trouble, forced to sell. the works of art of the house to settle the debts of the son; however, the situation is resolved and love triumphs.

Cast 
 Romina Power as Rosetta Belmonte 
 Al Bano as Andrea 
 Nino Taranto as Antonio Belmonte 
 Bice Valori as Rosa De Barberis 
 Dolores Palumbo as Madre di Andrea
 Pippo Baudo as Duke Pippo 
 Stelvio Rosi as Giorgio De Barberis 
 Nino Terzo as Gaetano  
 Enzo Cannavale as Gennarino 
 Enzo Guarini as Avvocato 
 Carlo Taranto as Francesco 
 Luciano Fineschi as Fefè 
 Anna Campori as Carmela
 Nicoletta Elmi as Rosy

References

External links

1969 films
Musicarelli
1969 musical comedy films
Films directed by Ettore Maria Fizzarotti
1960s Italian-language films
1960s Italian films